Regina Goodwin (born September 22, 1962) is an American politician who has served in the Oklahoma House of Representatives from the 73rd district since 2015.

Early life 
Regina Goodwin was born in Tulsa, Oklahoma and raised in Tulsa's historic Greenwood District, which is commonly known as Black Wall Street. She is a descendant of a survivor of the 1921 Tulsa race massacre, and is the daughter of Edward Goodwin, Jr. and the granddaughter of Edward L. Goodwin, both of whom were long time editors of The Oklahoma Eagle, Oklahoma's longest-running Black-owned newspaper.

Goodwin graduated from Booker T. Washington High School in Tulsa in 1980, and received a Bachelor of Fine Arts Degree from the University of Kansas. She completed coursework for her master's degree at Columbia College in Chicago, Illinois.

Oklahoma State Legislature 
Goodwin was elected to serve as State Representative, Tulsa House District 73 in a 2015 special election. Goodwin is Assistant Minority Floor Leader and the Chair of the Oklahoma Legislative Black Caucus, which is made of up seven members.

Goodwin has worked on issues related to public education, housing, health care, and police reform. In 2019, she highlighted possible instances of excessive use of force by Tulsa police officers, following the 2016 killing of Terrence Crutcher by Tulsa police officer, Betty Shelby and the 2017 Tulsa police killing of Joshua Barre. In 2020, Goodwin and other members of the Black Caucus again called for police reform, when, on June 4, 2020, Tulsa police stopped two African American boys walking down a street and detained them for jaywalking. Police body cam footage showed one officer sitting on one of the boys while holding the back of his neck and pressing his face to the ground.

In June 2020, when Donald Trump announced that he would be holding a campaign rally on Juneteenth a few blocks from the Tulsa 1921 race massacre, Goodwin held a press conference with other members of the Black Caucus to register their concerns about heightened racial tensions and increased health risks related to COVID-19. Trump subsequently rescheduled the rally to June 20, 2020. Goodwin called Trump's choice to hold a rally "more provocative than productive."

In June 2021, on the 100-year anniversary of the Tulsa Race Massacre, Goodwin and other members of the Black Caucus called for reparations and other measures to ensure that massacre is never repeated.

Goodwin is the author of the following bills that are now law:
 HB 1357, the Caregiver Support Act, which provides resources and $360 vouchers for caregivers
 HB 3393, the Anti-Shackling Law, which bans the shackling of pregnant incarcerated women during labor and delivery
 HB 2253, which clarifies when voting rights are restored for people convicted of felonies

Select awards 

 Oklahoma Commission on the Status of Women Guardian Award
 AARP - State and National Caregiver Awards
 Oklahoma Women's Coalition Courage Award

References

1962 births
Living people
Democratic Party members of the Oklahoma House of Representatives
University of Kansas alumni
African-American state legislators in Oklahoma
21st-century American politicians
21st-century American women politicians
Politicians from Tulsa, Oklahoma
Columbia College Chicago alumni
Women state legislators in Oklahoma
21st-century African-American women
21st-century African-American politicians
20th-century African-American people
20th-century African-American women